Calamia flavirufa is a moth of the family Noctuidae. It is found in Southern Africa, including Zimbabwe and Eswatini.

Hadeninae
Insects of Eswatini
Lepidoptera of Zimbabwe
Owlet moths of Africa